DIAC is a four-letter acronym that may stand for:
DIode for Alternating Current, a bidirectional trigger diode
Department of Immigration and Citizenship, an Australian government department
Dental Industry Association of Canada
Disability Information & Advice Centre, a British charity
Design Industry Advisory Committee
Defense Intelligence Analysis Center, the former name of the Defense Intelligence Agency Headquarters
Dubai International Academic City